Herman Joel Myhrberg  (26 December 1889 – 9 August 1919) was a Swedish association football player who competed in the 1912 Summer Olympics. He played as forward one match in the main tournament as well as one match in the consolation tournament.

References

External links
 Swedish squad in 1912 

1889 births
1919 deaths
Swedish footballers
Sweden international footballers
Örgryte IS players
Olympic footballers of Sweden
Footballers at the 1912 Summer Olympics
Association football forwards
Footballers from Gothenburg